Agniputra is an action Hindi film directed by Vijay Reddy made in 2000. A revenge drama, it stars Mithun Chakraborty in the lead role.

Plot
The story begins with Arjun working in a band with his family, consisting of three sisters and his widowed mother. Arjun falls in love with the daughter of an MLA, who was involved with his family. The police make a false accusation against Arjun and his sisters and accuse them of being sex workers. It turns out that the MLA is behind the case. His sisters end up being sexually assaulted by the MLA, and two of them end up committing suicide. Arjun decides to seek vengeance against the goons. and with some toil and foil he eventually outsmarts them.

Cast

Mithun Chakraborty 
 Vinita
Shashikala
Deep Shikha
Maleeka Ghai
Purnima Talwalkar
Prem Chopra
Asrani
Pramod Moutho
Bharat Kapoor
Deepak Shirke
Birbal
Viju Khote
Dinesh Hingoo
Mahavir Shah
Gurbachan Singh

Soundtrack
The soundtrack is composed by Nikhil-Vinay except for Ek Haseen Ladki composed by Rajesh Roshan with lyrics by Anand Bakshi.
 "Choona Na Mera Ghungta" - Poornima
 "Ek Hassen Ladki" - Udit Narayan
 "Kisne Dekha Kisne Jana" - Sonu Nigam
 "Solah Baras Intezar Karliya" - Asha Bhosle
 "Tu Ne Mujhe Pukara" - Kumar Sanu, Anuradha Paudwal

References

External links

2000 films
2000s Hindi-language films
Mithun's Dream Factory films
Films shot in Ooty
Films scored by Nikhil-Vinay
Indian action films